Banarasi Das, popularly known as Babu Banarasi Das (8 July 1912 – 3 August 1985) was an Indian politician and Chief Minister of Uttar Pradesh. He was from Janata Party.

Career
Banarasi Das was a freedom fighter. He went to jail many times during India's freedom struggle. He was elected to Uttar Pradesh Vidhan Sabha in 1977 as member of Janata Party from Hapur or Khurja, both those seats having elected a member named Banarsi Das.  He was Chief Minister from 28 February 1979 to 17 February 1980. He joined Charan Singh's faction when Janata Party split. He lost 1980 Vidhan Sabha election.

Personal life
Banarasi Das was born in Utarawli, Bulandshahr, Uttar Pradesh.
Banarasi Das was married and had five sons and five daughters. Two of his sons followed his footsteps. The elder one Shri Harendra Agarwal was the former member of legislative council & is active in Indian politics. The youngest son Late Dr Akhilesh Das Gupta was a former Rajya sabha MP and ex national general secretary of Bahujan Samaj Party and was Minister of State in Manmohan singh government.

Legacy
An Indian postal stamp featuring Das was issued in 2013. Babu Banarasi Das University, Lucknow, and Babu Banarasi Das Indoor Stadium in Uttar Pradesh are named in his honor.

References

External links

 Short biography
 Chief Ministers of Uttar Pradesh

1912 births
1985 deaths
People from Bulandshahr
Chief Ministers of Uttar Pradesh
Uttar Pradesh MLAs 1977–1980
Speakers of the Uttar Pradesh Legislative Assembly
Lok Sabha members from Uttar Pradesh
Chief ministers from Janata Party
Indian National Congress politicians
Janata Party politicians
Janata Party (Secular) politicians
Lok Dal politicians
Politicians from Varanasi